Daniel Wayne Owen Morgan (born 13 February 1974 in Chelmsford, Essex, England) is a Bermudian cricketer, who played with the Bermudian cricket team in their first ever One Day International when they played Canada on 17 May 2006. Morgan scored one as Bermuda won the game by three wickets under the Duckworth-Lewis method.

Daniel Morgan is a qualified physiotherapist having been part of the Bermuda cricket team in that capacity for the 2005 ICC Trophy in Ireland before making his playing debut. That is not where the Irish connection begins and ends. He studied in Trinity College Dublin, playing for the university and also for Dublin club YMCA. He is a free-scoring middle-order batsman who enjoys dominating bowlers.

External links

 
 Statistical summary from CricketArchive

1974 births
Living people
Bermudian cricketers
Bermuda One Day International cricketers
Sportspeople from Chelmsford